Yavru may refer to:

 Yavru, Amasya, a village in Amasya Province, Turkey
 Zeki Yavru, Turkish footballer